Serena Williams and Venus Williams were the defending champions, but Serena withdrew from the tournament (due to an injury) and Venus didn't want to participate with another player.

Virginia Ruano Pascual and Paola Suárez reached the final of the Australian Open for the second time (in 2003 they lost to Williams sisters). This time they won in the final 6–4, 6–3, against Svetlana Kuznetsova and Elena Likhovtseva.

Seeds

Draw

Finals

Top half

Section 1

Section 2

Bottom half

Section 3

Section 4

External links
 2004 Australian Open – Women's draws and results at the International Tennis Federation
 Official Results Archive (Australian Open) 
 Official Results Archive (WTA)

Women's Doubles
Australian Open (tennis) by year – Women's doubles
2004 in Australian women's sport